CCRG may refer to:

 Center for Computational Relativity and Gravitation, Rochester Institute of Technology
 Central Cultural Revolution Group, China
 Charm City Roller Girls, Baltimore, Maryland
 Classic City Roller Girls, Athens, Georgia
 Climate Change Research Group, a division of the Royal Geographical Society
 Cognitive Computing Research Group, University of Memphis